Marlin E. Chinn (born April 16, 1970) is an American college basketball coach.

Early life and education
Born in Washington, D.C., Chinn graduated from Hampton University with a degree in accounting in 1992.

Coaching career
Chinn began his coaching career at high schools in Washington, D.C., first as assistant boys' coach at Archbishop Carroll High School from 1994 to 1997, then Theodore Roosevelt Senior High School in the 1997–98 school year.

From 1998 to 2005, Chinn was an assistant coach at Mount St. Mary's University. He helped Mount St. Mary's win the Northeast Conference regular season titles in 1999 and 2001.

Chinn then became an assistant coach under Phyllis Mangina at Seton Hall in 2005, then at Maryland under Brenda Frese from 2009 to 2015. Following Maryland's run to the 2015 Final Four, Chinn became a head coach for the first time at FIU in 2015. FIU went 5–26 (2–16 C-USA) in Chinn's first and only season.

On March 11, 2016, FIU fired Chinn for an NCAA improper benefits rules violation, specifically a $600 loan to team captain Destini Feagin to resolve a school debt. The university suspended Chinn two weeks earlier, after Feagin accused Chinn of sexual harassment that persisted throughout the season.

Head coaching record

References

1970 births
Living people
Hampton University alumni
Maryland Terrapins women's basketball coaches
Seton Hall Pirates women's basketball coaches
FIU Panthers women's basketball coaches
Basketball coaches from Washington, D.C.
High school basketball coaches in the United States
African-American basketball coaches
21st-century African-American sportspeople
20th-century African-American sportspeople